

394001–394100 

|-bgcolor=#f2f2f2
| colspan=4 align=center | 
|}

394101–394200 

|-bgcolor=#f2f2f2
| colspan=4 align=center | 
|}

394201–394300 

|-bgcolor=#f2f2f2
| colspan=4 align=center | 
|}

394301–394400 

|-bgcolor=#f2f2f2
| colspan=4 align=center | 
|}

394401–394500 

|-id=445
| 394445 Unst ||  || Unst is one of the North Isles of the Shetland Islands, Scotland. Bordered by the Atlantic Ocean and the North Sea, Unst is the northernmost of the inhabited Scottish islands. A land of Viking heritage, Unst is remarkable for its geology, its wildlife, and its very active community life. || 
|}

394501–394600 

|-bgcolor=#f2f2f2
| colspan=4 align=center | 
|}

394601–394700 

|-bgcolor=#f2f2f2
| colspan=4 align=center | 
|}

394701–394800 

|-bgcolor=#f2f2f2
| colspan=4 align=center | 
|}

394801–394900 

|-bgcolor=#f2f2f2
| colspan=4 align=center | 
|}

394901–395000 

|-bgcolor=#f2f2f2
| colspan=4 align=center | 
|}

References 

394001-395000